Janko Drašković (Hungarian: Draskovich János; 20 October 1770 – 14 January 1856) was a Croatian politician who is associated with the beginnings of the Illyrian movement, a 19th-century national revival. Drašković studied law and philosophy before joining the military, from which he was discharged on medical grounds. In the 1790s, Drašković pursued a political career, winning a seat in the Croatian Parliament and in the Diet of Hungary. 

Drašković advocated for the protection of Croatian interests against the threats of Germanisation and Magyarisation in the Habsburg monarchy, and subsequently in the Austrian Empire, Drašković preferred gradual political reforms; he  became a leading figure in the Croatian national revival following the 1832 publication of the Dissertation, a manifesto outlining the main political, cultural, economic, social development and cohesion problems in Croatia. The Dissertation became largely regarded as the programme of the Croatian national revival. Drašković supported and significantly contributed to the group gathered around Ljudevit Gaj in working toward the objective outlined in the Dissertation. Gaj's group and others supporting the objectives of the Croatian national revival became known as Illyrians after the term Drašković used for the unified Croatian lands proposed in the Dissertation.

Drašković's lasting contribution to the culture of Croatia is Matica hrvatska, which he helped establish in 1842. The institution, which was initially named Matica ilirska, was established to promote literacy and knowledge in Croatia – in the national language – to improve the economic circumstances of the country and its people. Drašković served as the first president of the newly established institution, and co-founded the People's Party, one of Croatia's first two political parties. Drašković was the party's first leader and chaired the Croatian Parliament in 1848.

Biography

Family, education and military career
Janko Drašković was born in Zagreb, Habsburg Kingdom of Croatia on 20 October 1770. His parents were Count Ivan VIII and Eleonora Felicita, members of the Drašković family. Janko's early education consisted of tutoring at the family's estates in Brezovica near Zagreb, Rečica near Karlovac, and Csíkszereda in Siebenbürgen, Transylvania. Drašković moved to Vienna to study law and philosophy before enlisting in the Habsburg military in 1787 as a Fahnenträger to develop a career that resembled his father's. Drašković joined the 37th Hungarian Infantry Regiment, serving in Nagyvárad and Galicia, and fought in the 1789 Siege of Belgrade. In late 1792, he was discharged on medical grounds with the rank of Oberleutnant. He rejoined the military, fighting in anti-Napoleonic volunteer units in 1802, 1805, and 1809–1811, in the Dalmatian theatre of the War of the Third Coalition, ultimately becoming a Colonel and thus matching his father's rank. Drašković married Cecilija Pogledić in 1794 and after her death in 1808, he married Franjica Kulmer. By that time, he had sold the estates in Transylvania and Brezovica, and moved to Rečica. Drašković had one son with Franjica; Josip, who died in his youth, leaving no issue.

Political career until 1830

Drašković became involved in politics in 1792, participating in the Croatian Sabor (parliament) for the first time. The Sabor decided in May 1790  Croatia's interests would be better protected against the potential return of absolutist monarchs like the recently deceased Joseph II, Holy Roman Emperor and the threat of Germanisation by having a joint government with the Kingdom of Hungary, which was also one of the Habsburg realms. The decision was a temporary measure until Croatia regained its territories tht were occupied by the Ottoman Empire and the Republic of Venice. Shortly after entering the Sabor, Drašković was a part of a parliamentary delegation that was sent to the Diet of Hungary in Pozsony.

While supporting political reforms and economic modernisation, Drašković advocated a gradual approach similar to the position held by Count István Széchenyi, the leader of the moderate faction of the Hungarian national movement. Drašković aimed for the gradual political evolution achieved in the United Kingdom. He advocated for the development of industry and export trade via the Port of Rijeka, and for education reforms to support economic development and to counter efforts of Hungarian nobility aimed at the Magyarisation of society. When the Hungarian Diet was reconvened in 1825, in addition to his seat in the Croatian Sabor, Drašković was elected as a delegate to the Hungarian Diet. Croatian delegates spoke of a Hungarian attack against Croatian rights, particularly the Diet's 1827 decision to introduce the Hungarian language as a mandatory part of the school curriculum in Croatia in 1833 as the first step of the introduction of Hungarian as the official language in Croatia.

Dissertation

In response to the efforts aimed at Magyarisation, a group of young authors known as the Idejna grupa iz Kapucinske ulice (Kapucinska Street Conceptual Group) gained prominence after they were introduced to Drašković through a mutual acquaintance, Ljudevit Vukotinović. Drašković became a patron of the group, which became the core of the Illyrian movement—primarily the Croatian national revival movement. In 1832, following his contact with the group, Drašković anonymously published his Dissertation. It was the first political, cultural and economic programme of the Croatian national revival. Although it was published anonymously, authorship of the Dissertation was immediately apparent to Drašković's contemporaries.

Dissertation, which was printed in Karlovac by Joan Nepomuk Prettner, was written in the Shtokavian dialect—the most-widely used dialect that was promoted by Gaj— as an instruction to future Croatian delegates to the Hungarian Diet. It examined then-current problems of Croatian lands and provided instructions prepared by Croatian Sabor for its delegation to the 1832 Hungarian Diet Herman Bužan, Antun Kukuljević Sakcinski, and Drašković. Its instructions were to defend municipal rights of Croatia; the temporary nature of the decision to cede authority to the Hungarian Diet until Croatia has sufficient territory to become self-reliant; and to protect the official status of Latin. The delegates were also directed to petition the king, if they were unsuccessful in the parliament, to grant Croatia the same autonomy as enjoyed by Transylvania. In Dissertation, Drašković stated the first ideas about the standardisation of the Croatian language. He called for a restoration of the authority of the Ban of Croatia, the establishment of an independent government without breaking of constitutional bonds with Hungary, use of the national language as the official language in the lands which would—apart from the Triune Kingdom of Croatia—encompass the demilitarised Military Frontier and later Bosnia and the Slovene Lands bordering Croatia, proposing the territory be called the "Great Illyria" or "Illyric Kingdom". Drašković assumed the imperial authorities in Vienna would support the plan because Francis II, Holy Roman Emperor, had established the Kingdom of Illyria in parts of the Slovene Lands, Istria and Croatia after the French had left the Illyrian Provinces.

The Sabor accepted Drašković's ideas but they were not universally popular among Croats, and were criticised as feudal and Austro-Slavism incapable of achieving trialism in the monarchy. Croatian nobility and clergy supported the national movement as a means to frustrate Hungarian plans to abolish feudal institutions and grant Protestantism in Croatia status equal to that of Roman Catholicism. The court in Vienna supported Drašković, with some reservations, and refused royal assent to two laws establishing Hungarian as the official language in Croatia the Hungarian Diet passed in the 1830s.

Final years

Drašković devoted his final years to strengthening Croatian national awareness through institutions and by helping Gaj on several occasions. Drašković arranged for Gaj to meet Francis II in 1833, launch his newspaper Novine Horvatske in 1835, and introduced him to politicians at the 1836 diet in Pozsony, where Gaj could promote his ideas. Ferdinand I of Austria recognised Drašković's efforts were recognised; he awarded Drašković the Order of Saint Stephen of Hungary in 1836. In 1835 and 1836, Drašković published several poems in Danica ilirska. Like other poetry of the Croatian national revival, they glorify homeland, freedom, and wine while condemning traitors. In 1838, Drašković published Ein Wort an Illyriens hochherzige Töchter, a manifesto aimed at curbing the spread of Germanisation among women of Croatian nobility and attracting them to the Illyrian movement. In the same year, three Illyrian reading rooms (Ilirska čitaonica) were founded – largely due to Drašković's efforts – in Varaždin, Karlovac, and Zagreb. The Illyrian reading room in Zagreb helped speed up cultural and overall development. In 1841, the first political parties in Croatia were established, including the Illyrian Party (later renamed People's Party (Narodna stranka)) which based its programme on the Dissertation. Drašković led the People's Party until 1848 and chaired the sitting of the Sabor, which appointed Josip Jelačić Ban of Croatia.

In 1842, Matica ilirska (later renamed Matica hrvatska), which was tasked with development of Croatian language, was established as a special branch of the Illyrian reading rooms. In his speech at the founding of Matica ilirska, Drašković stated its main purpose was the spreading of science and literacy in the national language, providing youth opportunities for education. He said this mostly meant the publication of good books at affordable prices. Drašković added Matica ilirska should translate useful books published abroad and publish such books. He added the objective should be the improvement of trade and agriculture to ensure appropriate food supply and income for the nation. Drašković served as the first president of Matica hrvatska until 1851. In 1853, Drašković was appointed as an imperial and royal advisor. Drašković died in Bad Radkersburg on 14 January 1856, while he was travelling to Bad Gleichenberg. Since 1893, his remains are buried at the Illyrian Arcade, which is part of Zagreb's Mirogoj Cemetery.

Legacy

In the 21st century, Croatian literary historians predominantly view Drašković as the progenitor and ideologue of the Croatian national revival. He played a key role in representing the Illyrian movement before authorities, nobility, and the general public. The establishment of Matica ilirska is deemed to be Drašković's main achievement. This view was held by late-19th-century Croatian literary historians such as Đuro Šurmin.

In the 20th century, following the unification of South Slavs in a Yugoslav state, there were different views and nuanced interpretations of Dissertation and Drašković in line with prevailing political views. In 1918, literary historian  wrote of the Dissertation as a monumental blow to Croatian separatism, equating its call for unification with the then-current processes of unification of the South Slavs in a single state, giving greater prominence to Gaj over Drašković in the context of the Illyrian movement. In the mid-1920s, literary historian  interpreted Drašković's role as that of a political patron of the Illyrians and the Dissertation as the most-progressive Croatian political programme to date. He said Yugoslavist ideas were the basis of the Dissertation with the leading role in the unification intended for Croatia as the South Slavic land with the greatest degree of political rights left intact. During World War II, following the occupation of Yugoslavia and the establishment of Nazi Germany-aligned puppet the Independent State of Croatia, literary historian  interpreted the Dissertation as a call to unify in the Croatian lands within Austria-Hungary and not in a pan-South-Slavic state. At the same time, Ježić deemed the roles played by Drašković and Gaj equally significant for the Croatian revival.

A bust of Drašković is displayed in the entrance lobby of the Croatian Parliament as one of its eight great parliamentarians, along with busts of Jelačić, Mažuranić, Josip Juraj Strossmayer, Eugen Kvaternik, Ante Starčević, Frano Supilo, and Vladimir Nazor. The Croatian State Archives is preserving in its collection works created through Drašković's public activities, as well as a portion of his private and official correspondence.

Bibliography

 Manifestos
 
 
 Poems
 Poskočnica (1835)
 Pdsma domorodska (1835)
 Napitnica ilirskoj mladeži (1835)
 Mladeži ilirskoj (1836)

Footnotes

References

Sources 

 
 
 
 
 
 
 
 
 
 
 
 
 
 

Janko
Croatian nobility
Croatian writers
People of the Illyrian movement
Politicians from Zagreb
Counts
Habsburg Croats
1770 births
1856 deaths
Burials at Mirogoj Cemetery
Counts of Croatia
18th-century Croatian people
19th-century Croatian people
18th-century Croatian nobility
19th-century Croatian nobility